James Paul Grigson Jr. (January 30, 1932 – June 3, 2004), nicknamed "Doctor Death" by some press accounts, was a Texas forensic psychiatrist who testified in 167 capital trials, nearly all of which resulted in death sentences. He was exposed as a charlatan and expelled by the American Psychiatric Association and the Texas Society of Psychiatric Physicians in 1995 for unethical conduct.

Career
In capital crime cases, Grigson, throughout his career, was typically an expert witness for the prosecution. Under Texas law, for death to be imposed the jury must believe the defendant not only to be guilty of the crime charged, but likely to commit additional violent crimes if not put to death. In almost every case, Grigson testified (often after meeting the defendant for just a few minutes, or not at all) that the defendant was an "incurable" sociopath who was "one hundred per cent certain" to kill again.

In the late 1980s, an investigation conducted by the Dallas attorney general's office looked into post-conviction outcomes of murder convicts whom Grigson had testified against. Contrary to expectations set by Grigson's testimony, those who were still in prison were generally nonviolent and cooperative. Of the twelve paroled convicts they were able to speak to, only one had committed a crime after release.

Randall Dale Adams case
One of the most notable, at least after the fact, appearances of Grigson in court occurred in the 1977 case of Randall Dale Adams, who was accused of murdering police officer Robert W. Wood. Adams was found guilty, and, on the basis of Grigson's testimony, was given the death penalty. Grigson told the jury that Adams would be an ongoing menace if kept alive.

Adams' conviction was unanimously upheld by the Texas Appellate Court. His death sentence, as a result of a 1980 Supreme Court decision, was commuted to life in prison by Texas Governor Bill Clements. 

The case was profiled in the 1988 documentary film The Thin Blue Line.

In 1989 the Texas Court of Criminal Appeals in Ex parte Adams overturned Adams' conviction on the grounds of malfeasance by the prosecutor and inconsistencies in the testimony of a key witness. The prosecution in Texas declined to go to a new trial, and Adams was eventually freed, after having spent approximately 12 years in prison.

Cameron Todd Willingham case
In 1991, Cameron Todd Willingham was accused of the capital murder of his three children due to arson. Grigson testified that Willingham was an incurable sociopath despite having never met him. His testimony helped prosecutors secure the death penalty, but Willingham's guilt has since been called into question due to modern fire science and a witness recantation. Willingham was executed in 2004 at the age of 36 years old.

Expulsion
In 1995, Grigson was expelled by the American Psychiatric Association and the Texas Society of Psychiatric Physicians for unethical conduct. The APA stated that Grigson had violated the organization's ethics code by  "arriving at a psychiatric diagnosis without first having examined the individuals in question, and for indicating, while testifying in court as an expert witness, that he could predict with 100 per cent certainty that the individuals would engage in future violent acts". Grigson unsuccessfully sued the APA to block his expulsion.

After Grigson's expulsion, the medical director of the American Academy of Psychiatry and the Law said that Grigson "oversteps the bounds of his professional competence" and that he was testifying in court about hypothetical situations containing insufficient detail for a sound professional opinion to be formed.

Grigson officially retired from the psychiatric profession in 2003.

Death
Grigson died in Dallas in June 2004 from lung cancer.

References

1932 births
2004 deaths
American psychiatrists
People from Texarkana, Texas
Deaths from lung cancer